Xerothamnella parvifolia, also known as the Small-leaved Little Dry Shrub, is a species of plant in the acanthus family that is endemic to Australia.

Description
The species grows as an intricately-branched, straggling shrub to about 1 m in height. The leaves are thick and stalkless, 4–10 mm long and 2–3 mm wide. The white and red flowers are about 10 mm long and occur in the upper leaf axils. Flowering usually takes place from November to January, and sometimes in other seasons, when triggered by adequate rainfall. The fruits are 7–8 mm long capsules.

Distribution and habitat
The species is found in the Channel Country IBRA bioregion, in south-western Queensland, Mount Poole in north-western New South Wales and in South Australia. It grows in low chenopod shrubland and low open woodland, in thin sandy clay soils, along the ridgetops and slopes of sandstone ranges.

Conservation
The species is listed as Vulnerable under Australia's EPBC Act and Endangered under New South Wales' Biodiversity Conservation Act. Threats include grazing and browsing by native and feral herbivores, as well as by mineral exploration activities.

References

parvifolia
Lamiales of Australia
Flora of New South Wales
Flora of Queensland
Flora of South Australia
Taxa named by Cyril Tenison White
Plants described in 1944